Çovdar (also, Chovdar, earlier Hartshangist (from )) is a village and municipality in the Dashkasan Rayon of Azerbaijan.

It has a population of 65. The municipality consists of the villages of Çovdar and Çaykənd.

References 

Populated places in Dashkasan District